Jay Prakash Narayan Yadav (born 2 August 1954) is an Indian politician from Bihar. He served as the Minister of State of Water Resources during UPA I under then Prime Minister Manmohan Singh. He was a member of the 14th Lok Sabha of India. Yadav represented the Munger constituency of Bihar and is a member of the Rashtriya Janata Dal (RJD) political party. He won the 2014 Indian general election from Banka Constituency and in 2019 lost to Giridhari Yadav from the same constituency.

Biography

Jai Prakash Narayan Yadav was born in Barhat, Jamui district, in Bihar state. His late father's name is Akhileshwar Prasad Yadav and his mother's name is Shanti Devi. Yadav holds a degree of Masters of Arts and Bachelor of Law from Patna University, Bihar. He married Savita Yadav on 18 February 1991. They have two daughters, elder Divya Prakash and younger Shefali Roy.

Political Tenure

 1980-1985 and 1990-2004 - Member, Bihar Legislative Assembly (four terms)
 1995-2000 - Minister, Primary, Secondary and Adult Education, Government of Bihar
 2000-2004 - Minister, Micro-irrigation, Government of Bihar
 2004-2009 - State Minister, water resources, Government of India and Lok Sabha member from Munger constituency
 2014-2019 - Lok Sabha member from Banka constituency

External links
 Home Page on the Parliament of India's Website
 

1954 births
Living people
People from Jamui
Rashtriya Janata Dal politicians
India MPs 2004–2009
Union ministers of state of India
Lok Sabha members from Bihar
India MPs 2014–2019
People from Banka district
Members of the Bihar Legislative Assembly